The Class 5M2 and Class 5M2A are electric multiple units that are used to provide commuter rail services by Metrorail in the major cities of South Africa. The original Class 5M2 trainsets were built for the South African Railways by Metro-Cammell between 1958 and 1960. Most of those in use today, however, are of Class 5M2A, built to the same design by Union Carriage & Wagon (UCW) from 1962 to 1985; a total of 4,447 coaches were built by UCW.

Although most of Metrorail's services are still operated by 5M2As, they are being progressively rebuilt into the new Class 10M3, 10M4 and 10M5. Class 5M2A coaches are stripped down to the underframe, which is then used as the base for the Class 10Ms.

Specifications

The Class 5M2s operate on the  track that is standard throughout Southern Africa. A motor coach can carry 56 seated and 110 standing passengers, and has a tare weight of 60 tonnes.

References

External links

Electric multiple units of South Africa
Metropolitan Cammell multiple units
Metrorail (South Africa)
Union Carriage & Wagon locomotives
3000 V DC multiple units